The 31st Battalion (Alberta), CEF, was an infantry battalion of the Canadian Expeditionary Force during the Great War. The battalion recruited in Alberta and was mobilized at Calgary. The battalion was authorized in November 1914 and embarked for Britain on 17 May 1915. On 18 September 1915 it disembarked in France, where it fought with the 6th Infantry Brigade, 2nd Canadian Division in France and Flanders until the end of the war. The battalion was disbanded in August 1920.

History 

The battalion was raised at Calgary, and started recruitment in Alberta, on 7 November 1914.

The battalion commander until late in the war was Lieutenant-Colonel Arthur Henry Bell of Calgary. After initial training in England, the battalion fought in Belgium and France, and was often at the forefront of the fighting at St. Eloi Craters, the Ypres Salient, Vimy Ridge (Thélus Village), Fresnoy, Somme, Second Battle of Passchendaele, the Battle of Amiens (1918), the Battle of Arras (1917), Battle of Drocourt-Quéant Line, Valenciennes, Mons, and the occupation of the Rhineland.

The battalion captured a Siberian pony from the Germans, which apparently had been captured from the Russians earlier in the war. The Canadians named this pony Heinie, and it became the 31st Battalion's mascot. After the war the 31st brought Heinie to Alberta, where it worked until at least the late 1920s for the Dominion Parks Branch near Banff, Alberta.

The bulk of the battalion returned to Canada on SS Cedric on 27 May 1919, and to Calgary on 1 June 1919, with the unit's disbandment occurring on 30 August 1920.

Through the course of the First World War, the 31st Battalion suffered losses of 941 dead, and an additional 2,312 non-fatal casualties. A total of 4,487 men served in the battalion.

Perpetuation 
The 31st Battalion (Alberta), CEF, is perpetuated by the South Alberta Light Horse. Perpetuation of the 31st Battalion was assigned to The Alberta Regiment in 1920. When this regiment split in 1924, both the South Alberta Regiment and the North Alberta Regiment carried the perpetuation. The North Albertas disbanded in 1936. The South Alberta Regiment merged into the South Alberta Light Horse (29th Armoured Regiment) in 1954.

Commanding Officers 
The 31st battalion had three Officers Commanding:

Lieutenant-Colonel A.H. Bell, DSO, 29 May 1915 – 23 April 1918
Lieutenant-Colonel E.S. Doughty, DSO, 23 April 1918 – 6 October 1918
Lieutenant-Colonel N. Spencer, DSO, 6 October 1918-Demobilization

Battle honours
The 31st Battalion was awarded the following honours:

 
 
 Flers–Courcelette
 Thiepval
 Ancre Heights
 Ancre, 1916
 
 Vimy, 1917
 Arleux
 Scarpe, 1917, '18
 
 Ypres, 1917
 Passchendaele
 
 Drocourt–Quéant
 
 Canal du Nord
 Cambrai, 1918

See also 

 List of infantry battalions in the Canadian Expeditionary Force

References

Sources
Canadian Expeditionary Force 1914-1919 by Col. G.W.L. Nicholson, CD, Queen's Printer, Ottawa, Ontario, 1962
Singer, Major Horace C. (Ed. Darrell Knight)  History of the 31st Canadian Infantry Battalion C.E.F. . (Calgary: Detselig Publishing, 2006). .

031
Military units and formations of Alberta
South Alberta Light Horse
South Alberta Regiment